Edwin Karl Rochus Freiherr von Manteuffel (24 February 180917 June 1885) was a Prussian Generalfeldmarschall noted for his victories in the Franco-Prussian War, and the first Imperial Lieutenant of Alsace–Lorraine from 1879 until his death.

Biography 
Son of the president of the superior court of Magdeburg, Manteuffel was born at Dresden and brought up with his cousin, Otto von Manteuffel (1805–1882), the Prussian statesman. He entered the guards cavalry at Berlin in 1827 and became an officer in 1828. After attending the War Academy for two years, and serving successively as aide-de-camp to General von Müffling and to Prince Albert of Prussia, he was promoted captain in 1843 and major in 1848, when he became aide-de-camp to Frederick William IV, whose confidence he had gained during the revolutionary movement in Berlin.

Promoted lieutenant-colonel in 1852, and colonel (and commanding officer of the 5th Uhlans) in 1853, Manteuffel was sent on important diplomatic missions to Vienna and St Petersburg. In 1857 he was promoted to major-general and chief of the Prussian Military Cabinet (the King's military advisers). He gave strong support to the Prince Regent's plans for the reorganization of the army. In 1861 he was violently attacked in a pamphlet by Karl Twesten (1820–1870), a Liberal leader, whom he had wounded in a duel, for which Manteuffel insisted on being briefly imprisoned. He was promoted to  lieutenant-general for the coronation of William I on 18 October 1861 and saw active service in that rank in the Danish War of 1864, then at its conclusion was appointed civil and military governor of Schleswig. In the Austrian War of 1866 he first occupied Holstein and afterwards commanded a division under Vogel von Falkenstein in the Hanoverian campaign, then in July succeeded Vogel in command of the Army of the Main.

Manteuffel's successful campaign ended with the occupation of Würzburg, and he received the order Pour le Mérite. However, on account of his monarchist political views throughout the political crises of the 1860s, and of his almost bigoted Roman Catholicism, he was regarded by Liberal politicians as a reactionary, and, unlike the other army commanders, he was not granted a financial reward for his services. He then went on a diplomatic mission to St Petersburg, where he was persona grata, and gained Russia's acquiescence to Prussia's domination of north Germany. On his return he was made honorary colonel of the 5th Dragoon Regiment. He was appointed to the command of the IX (Schleswig-Holstein) Corps in 1866. But having previously exercised both civil and military control in the Elbe duchies he was unwilling to be a purely military commander under one of his former civil subordinates, and retired from the army for a year.

In 1868, however, Manteuffel returned to active service and on 18 September 1869 he received the Grand Cross of the Order of the Red Eagle. In the Franco-Prussian War of 1870–71 he commanded the I Corps under Steinmetz, distinguishing himself in the Battle of Borny-Colombey, and in the repulse of Bazaine at Noisseville. In October he succeeded Steinmetz in the command of the 1st Army, won the Battle of Amiens against Général de brigade Jean-Joseph Farre, and occupied Rouen. However he was less fortunate against Faidherbe at Pont Noyelles and Bapaume.

In January 1871 he commanded the newly formed Army of the South, which he led, in spite of hard frost, through the Côte-d'Or and over the plateau of Langres, cut off Bourbaki's Army of the East with 80,000 men, and, after the action of Pontarlier, compelled it to cross the Swiss frontier, where it was disarmed. His immediate reward was the Grand Cross of the Iron Cross, and at the conclusion of peace he was made a member of the Order of the Black Eagle. When the Southern Army was disbanded Manteuffel commanded the Second Army and, from June 1871 until 1873, the army of occupation left in France, showing great tact in a difficult position.

At the close of the occupation, the Emperor promoted Manteuffel to the rank of Field Marshal and awarded him a large financial grant, and about the same time Alexander II of Russia gave him the Order of St. Andrew. After this he was employed on several diplomatic missions, was for a time Governor of Berlin, and in 1879—perhaps, as was commonly reported, because he was considered by Bismarck as a formidable rival—he was appointed Imperial Lieutenant of occupied Alsace–Lorraine. He is remembered in Alsace–Lorraine as a very human, cultivated man, and as a conciliator whose fairness was often abused by some dominant figures. Opening the first session of the Landesausschuss (the regional assembly of Alsace–Lorraine), he announced his firm intention to gain full autonomy for Alsace–Lorraine, so that it could become a fully-fledged state of the German Empire. He died at Carlsbad, Bohemia, in 1885, still in office but without having achieved his aim.

Honours
He received the following orders and decorations:

Notes

References 

Attribution:
 
 Pierre Zind, Elsass Lothringen/Alsace Lorraine une nation interdite, 1870–1940, Paris: Copernic, 1979. 

1809 births
1885 deaths
Military personnel from Dresden
Barons of Germany
Field marshals of the German Empire
Field marshals of Prussia
Prussian military personnel of the Second Schleswig War
Prussian people of the Austro-Prussian War
German military personnel of the Franco-Prussian War
Burials at Frankfurt Main Cemetery
Recipients of the Grand Cross of the Iron Cross
Recipients of the Pour le Mérite (military class)
Grand Crosses of the Military Order of Max Joseph
Grand Crosses of the Military Merit Order (Bavaria)
Grand Crosses of the Order of Saint Stephen of Hungary
Grand Officiers of the Légion d'honneur
Recipients of the Military Merit Cross (Mecklenburg-Schwerin), 1st class
Recipients of the Order of St. George of the Third Degree
Recipients of the Order of St. Vladimir, 1st class
Knights of the Order of the Sword